Löfgren or Lofgren is a Swedish surname. Notable people with the surname include:

Löfgren
Anna-Lena Löfgren (1944–2010), Swedish singer
 Charles Löfgren, chairman of Västmanland-Nerikes BK
Eliel Löfgren (1872–1940), Swedish jurist and politician
Johan Albert Constantin Löfgren (1854–1918), botanist at the Rio de Janeiro Botanical Garden
Gösta Löfgren (1891–1932), Finnish footballer
Gösta Löfgren (1923–2006), Swedish footballer
 Jonna Löfgren, drummer of the Scottish band Glasvegas
 Katia Löfgren, singer of the Swedish band Caramell
Marianne Löfgren (1910–1957), Swedish actress 
Mikael Löfgren (born 1969), Swedish biathlete 
Nils Löfgren (1913–1967), Swedish chemist 
Sara Löfgren (born 1977), Swedish singer
Stig Löfgren (1912–1998), Swedish Army lieutenant general
Tomas Löfgren, Swedish ski-orienteering competitor and world champion
Ulla Löfgren (born 1943), Swedish politician of the Moderate Party

Lofgren
Edward J. Lofgren (1914–2016), American physicist
Esther Lofgren (born 1985), American rower
Karen Lofgren (born 1976), Canadian artist
Mark Lofgren (born 1961), American politician
Mike Lofgren, American politician
Nils Lofgren (born 1951), American musician
William Lofgren (1913–2004), American canoer
William Lofgren, American tennis player
Zoe Lofgren (born 1947), American politician

See also
Lofgren Peninsula - ice-covered peninsula, Antarctica
Löfgren syndrome -   type of acute sarcoidosis
Nils (album) - 1979 record album by Nils Lofgren 
Nils Lofgren (album) - 1975 record album by Nils Lofgren 
7157 Lofgren -  Main-belt Asteroid discovered by S. J. Bus at Siding Spring Observatory

Swedish-language surnames